Mulgrew Miller was an American jazz pianist. His appearances on record date from at least 1980 to 2012, the year before his death. They include more than 15 albums under his own name.

Discography
These lists exclude compilations.

As leader/co-leader

Main sources:

As sideman
An asterisk (*) indicates that it is year of release, not recording.

Main sources:

References

Jazz discographies
Discographies of American artists